Sir Hugh Charles Clifford,  (5 March 1866 – 18 December 1941) was a British colonial administrator.

Early life
Clifford was born in Roehampton, London, the sixth of the eight children of Major-General Sir Henry Hugh Clifford and his wife Josephine Elizabeth, née Anstice; his grandfather was Hugh Clifford, 7th Baron Clifford of Chudleigh.

Family
Clifford married Minna à Beckett, daughter of Gilbert Arthur à Beckett, on 15 April 1896, and they had one son and two daughters: Hugh Gilbert Francis Clifford, Mary Agnes Philippa and Monica Elizabeth Mary. Minna Clifford died on 14 January 1907.

On 24 September 1910 Hugh Clifford remarried, to Elizabeth Lydia Rosabelle Bonham, CBE, daughter of Edward Bonham of Bramling, Kent, a British consul. A Catholic, she was the widow of Henry Philip Ducarel de la Pasture of Llandogo Priory, Monmouthshire. Clifford thus became stepfather to E. M. Delafield, author of the Provincial Lady series.

Career
Hugh Clifford intended to follow his father, Sir Henry Hugh Clifford, a distinguished British Army general, into the military, but later decided to join the civil service in the Straits Settlements, with the assistance of his relative Sir Frederick Weld, the then Governor of the Straits Settlements and also the British High Commissioner in Malaya. He was later transferred to the British Protectorate of the Federated Malay States. Clifford arrived in Malaya in 1883, aged 17.

He first became a cadet in the State of Perak. During his twenty years there and on the east coast of the Malay Peninsula in Pahang, Clifford socialised with the local Malays and studied their language and culture deeply. He came to sympathise strongly with and admire certain aspects of the traditional indigenous cultures, while recognising that their transformation as a consequence of the colonial project which he served was inevitable. He was a Government agent of Pahang (1887-1888), Superintendent of Ulu Pahang (1889), served as British Resident at Pahang, 1896–1900 and 1901–1903, and Governor of North Borneo, 1900–1901.

In 1903, he left Malaya to take the post of Colonial Secretary of Trinidad and Tobago. Later he was appointed Governor of British Ceylon (1907-1912), Governor of the Gold Coast, 1912–1919, Nigeria, 1919–1925, and Ceylon, 1925–1927. During his service in Malaya and afterwards he wrote numerous stories, reflections and novels primarily about Malayan life, many of them imbued with an ambivalent nostalgia. His last posting was, for him, a welcome return to the Malaya he loved, as Governor of the Straits Settlements and British High Commissioner in Malaya, where he served from 1927 until 1929, after which Lady Clifford's ill-health forced his retirement. Alongside his other books he wrote Farther India, which chronicles European explorations and discoveries in Southeast Asia.

Legacy
Several schools in Malaysia are named Clifford School in his honour, such as;
 SK Clifford, Kuala Lipis
 SMK Clifford, Kuala Lipis
 SK Clifford, Kuala Kangsar
 SMK Clifford, Kuala Kangsar

Clifford is briefly referred to in V. S. Naipaul's The Mimic Men. Though he was Colonial Secretary of Trinidad and Tobago (second in command to the Governor), in the book he is named as a former Governor of Isabella, a fictitious Caribbean island based on Trinidad.

Clifford Pier in Singapore was built between 1927 and 1933, and was named after Sir Hugh Clifford when he was the former Governor of the Straits Settlements between 1927 and 1930. It was opened on 3 June 1933.

Honours
Clifford was appointed Knight Commander of the Order of St Michael and St George (KCMG) in 1909, Knight Grand Cross of the Order of St Michael and St George (GCMG) in the 1921 Birthday Honours, and Knight Grand Cross of the Order of the British Empire (GBE) in 1925.

Death
Clifford died peacefully on 18 December 1941 in his native Roehampton. His widow, Elizabeth, died on 30 October 1945.

Publications
Clifford, Hugh (1989) In Court and Kampung. Singapore : Graham Brash (Pte.) Ltd. 
First published as: East coast etchings. Singapore : Straits Times Press, 1896.
Clifford, Hugh (1993) At the court of Pelesu and other Malayan stories. Kuala Lumpur : Oxford University Press, 1993.
First published as: Stories by Sir Hugh Clifford. Kuala Lumpur : Oxford University Press, 1966.
Clifford, Hugh (1992) Report of an expedition into Trengganu and Kelantan in 1895. Kuala Lumpur : MBRAS.
"First published in the Journal of the Malayan Branch of the Royal Asiatic Society, v. 34 pt. 1 in 1961" --T.p. verso.
"An expedition to Kelantan and Trengganu : 1895"--cover title.
Clifford, Hugh (1989) Saleh : a prince of Malaya. Singapore : Oxford University Press.
Originally published: A prince of Malaya. New York : Harper & Brothers, 1926.
Clifford, Hugh (1978) Journal of a mission to Pahang : January 15 to April 11, 1887. Honolulu : University of Hawaii, Southeast Asian Studies Program.
Clifford, Hugh (1970) In a corner of Asia; being tales and impressions of men and things in the Malay Peninsula. Freeport, New York : Books for Libraries Press.
Clifford, Hugh (1911) The Downfall of the Gods. Historical novel about the decline of the Khmer Empire in the 13th century AD. London, John Murray.
Clifford, Hugh (1894-1902) A Dictionary of the Malay Language. Co-authored with Frank Swettenham, the dictionary, which was published in stages between 1894 and 1902, was abandoned after the letter 'G' as by then it had been made redundant by the publication of R.J. Wilkinson's A Malay English Dictionary.

References

External links
Biografi Clifford
Cowan, C. D. (Charles Donald)(1961) Nineteenth-century Malaya : the origins of British political control. London : Oxford University Press.
Swettenham, Frank Athelstane (1907), British Malaya: an account of the origin and progress of British influence in Malaya. London : John Lane the Bodley Head.
Gailey, Harry A. (1982) Clifford, imperial proconsul. London : Rex Collings.
Holden, Philip (2000) Modern subjects/colonial texts : Hugh Clifford & the discipline of English literature in the Straits Settlements & Malaya, 1895-1907. Greensboro, North Carolina : ELT Press.

 
 
 
 

1866 births
1941 deaths
People from Roehampton
Governors of North Borneo
Governors of the Straits Settlements
British Governors and Governors-General of Nigeria
Governors of British Ceylon
British Roman Catholics
Colonial Administrative Service officers
Knights Grand Cross of the Order of the British Empire
Knights Grand Cross of the Order of St Michael and St George
Governors of the Gold Coast (British colony)
British expatriates in Trinidad and Tobago
British expatriates in Ghana
British expatriates in Malaysia
British expatriates in Singapore
Chief Secretaries of Ceylon
Ceylonese Knights Commander of the Order of St Michael and St George
20th-century British novelists
British historical novelists
English orientalists
Writers of historical fiction set in the Middle Ages
Administrators in British Singapore
Administrators in British Malaya
Members of the Legislative Council of Ceylon